This article concerns soccer records in Australia. Unless otherwise stated, records are taken from the A-League Men or National Soccer League. Where a different record exists for the top flight (National Soccer League 1977–2004, and A-League Men 2005–present), this is also given.

League

Records in this section refer to the Australian top division, as a combination of the A-League Men or National Soccer League.

Titles
 Most Premiership titles: 5, South Melbourne
 Most Championship titles: 5, Sydney FC
 Most consecutive Premiership titles: 2, several clubs
 Most consecutive Championship titles: 3, Sydney City: 1980, 1981, 1982

Representation
 Most seasons overall: 29 seasons, Brisbane Roar
 Fewest seasons overall: 1 season, Canterbury Marrickville, Collingwood Warriors, Mooroolbark, and Wollongong United

Wins
Most wins overall: 378, South Melbourne
Most consecutive wins: 10, Western Sydney Wanderers (13 January 2013 to 16 March 2013)
Most wins in a season: 20, South Melbourne (National Soccer League, 2000–01)

Draws
Most draws overall: 194, Adelaide City
Most consecutive draws: 6, Wellington Phoenix (4 September 2009 to 17 October 2009)
Most draws in a season: 15, Wollongong City (National Soccer League, 1983)

Losses
Most losses overall: 255, Wollongong Wolves
Most consecutive losses: 16, Canberra Cosmos (30 March 1998 to 10 January 1999)
Fewest losses in a season: 1, Brisbane Roar (A-League, 2011–12)

Points
 Most points overall: 1,317, South Melbourne
 Most points in a season: 70 (16 wins, 2 draws), Melbourne Knights (National Soccer League, 1994–95)
 Fewest points in a season: 6, New Zealand Knights (A-Leage, 2005–06)

Games without a win
Most consecutive league games without a win: 23, Canberra Cosmos (22 February 1998 to 24 January 1999)

Games without a defeat
Most consecutive league games without a defeat: 36, Brisbane Roar (18 September 2010 to 26 November 2011)

Goals
Most league goals scored in a season: 80, Wollongong Wolves (National Soccer League, 2000–01)
Most goals scored in total: 1,293, Marconi Stallions
Most consecutive games without scoring: 6, jointly by:
Parramatta Eagles (11 December 1993 to 9 January 1994)
Preston Lions (11 October 1987 to 28 February 1988)
Preston Lions (12 July 1989 to 18 November 1989)
New Zealand Knights (10 September 2006 to 14 October 2006)
Newcastle Jets (4 December 2015 to 9 January 2016)

Scorelines
Record win: Marconi Stallions 9–0 Blacktown City (16 March 1980)
Highest scoring draw: Newcastle Breakers 5–5 Canberra Cosmos (16 February 1996)

Disciplinary
Most red cards in a career (individual): 13, Andrew Marth (Sunshine George Cross, Melbourne Knights and Carlton)

Transfers
Highest transfer fee received: A$1.7 million
Zeljko Kalac, from Sydney United to Leicester City (1995)

Individual

Appearances

Most Championships won by an individual player 5, Gerry Gomez, Tony Pezzano, Michael Theo
Most career league appearances: 522, Alex Tobin (1984 to 2004)
Most career league appearances as a goalkeeper: 479, Clint Bolton (1993 to 2013)
Most career league appearances as a substitute:, 115, Matt Simon (2006 to 2020)
Most career league appearances at one club: 446, Sergio Melta (Adelaide City, 1977 to 1995)
Most career consecutive league appearances: 214, Bobby Russell (1980 to 1988)
Oldest player: Bobby Charlton, 42 years and 150 days (for Blacktown City vs. St George, 9 March 1980)
Youngest player: Daniel Watkins, 14 years and 268 days (for Parramatta Eagles vs. Morwell Falcons, 2 April 1995)

Goals

Most career league goals: 240, Damian Mori (446 matches, for South Melbourne, Sunshine George Cross, Melbourne Croatia, Adelaide City, Perth Glory, Central Coast Mariners and Queensland Roar, 1989 to 2008)
Most consecutive league matches scored in: 10, Jamie Maclaren (10 matches, for Melbourne City, 2022 to 2023)
Most league goals in a season: 31, Damian Mori (1995–96 NSL)
Most goals in a game: 6, jointly by:
 Pat Brodnik (for Wollongong Wolves vs. West Adelaide, 18 March 1990)
 Ivan Kelic (for Melbourne Knights vs. Wollongong Macedonia, 24 March 1991)
Fastest goal: 3.7 seconds, Damian Mori (for Adelaide City vs. Sydney United, 3 December 1995)
Fastest hat-trick (time between first and third goals): 6 minutes, joint record:
 Jason Bennett (for Newcastle Breakers, 11 October 1996)
 Besart Berisha (for Brisbane Roar, 28 October 2011)
Fastest goal by a substitute: 18 seconds, Nebojša Marinković, 18 seconds (for Perth Glory vs. Melbourne City, 16 April 2017)
Fastest player to 100 Australian goals: Jamie Maclaren — 144 games
Longest goalkeeping run without conceding a goal: 728 minutes,  Jeff Olver (Heidelberg, 15 July 1984 to 9 September 1984)
Youngest goalscorer: Danny Wright, 15 years and 289 days (for Brisbane Lions vs. Blacktown City, 17 August 1980)
Oldest goalscorer: Bobby Charlton, 42 years and 150 days (for Blacktown City vs. St George-Budapest, 9 March 1980)

Australia Cup

Final

Team
Most wins: 3, Adelaide United (2014, 2018, 2019)
Most consecutive wins: 2, Adelaide United (2018, 2019)
Most consecutive defeats in finals: 2, Perth Glory (2014, 2015)
Most appearances in finals: 4, Adelaide United (2014, 2017, 2018, 2019)
Most Final appearances without win: 2, Perth Glory (2014, 2015)
Most Final appearances without defeat: 2, Melbourne Victory (2015, 2021)
Longest winning streak in finals: 2, Adelaide United (2018, 2019)
Biggest win: 4 goals, Adelaide United 4–0 Melbourne City (2019)
Most goals in a final: 4 goals, Adelaide United 4–0 Melbourne City (2019)
Most defeats in finals: 2, joint record:
 Perth Glory (2014, 2015)
 Sydney FC (2016, 2018)

Individual
Most wins: 3, joint record:
 Michael Marrone (Adelaide United: 2014, 2018, 2019)
 Michael Jakobsen (Melbourne City: 2016 & Adelaide United: 2018, 2019)
Most appearances in finals: 4, Michael Marrone (Adelaide United: 2014, 2017, 2018, 2019)
Most goals in a final: 2, Craig Goodwin (Adelaide United: 2018)
Most goals in finals: 2, joint record:
 Craig Goodwin (Adelaide United) (2 in 2018)
 Nikola Mileusnic (Adelaide United) (1 in 2017, 1 in 2019)
 Oliver Bozanic (Melbourne Victory) (1 in 2015) & (Central Coast Mariners) (1 in 2021)
 Al Hassan Toure (Adelaide United) (1 in 2019) & (Macarthur FC) (1 in 2022)
Youngest Australia Cup finalist: Al Hassan Toure (Adelaide United, 19 years, 146 days
Youngest player to score in an Australia Cup Final: Al Hassan Toure (Adelaide United, 19 years, 146 days)

All rounds
This section refers to the Round of 32 onwards, and not the preliminary rounds for member federations.

Most Australia Cup goals scored: 68, Sydney FC
Most Australia Cup goals conceded: 33, Sydney United 58
Highest Australia Cup goal difference: +40, Sydney FC
Most Australia Cup games played: 30, Adelaide United
Most Australia Cup games won: 25, Adelaide United
Most Australia Cup games lost: 8, joint record
 Brisbane Roar
 Central Coast Mariners
 Newcastle Jets
 Perth Glory
 Wellington Phoenix
 Western Sydney Wanderers
Most Australia Cup games drawn: 3, joint record:
 Perth Glory
 Sydney United 58
Largest winning margin : Shamrock Rovers Darwin 0–8 Sydney FC (Round of 32, 2 August 2017)
Most clubs competing in a season: 765 (2020 & 2021)
Most consecutive games without defeat: 12, Adelaide United (1 August 2018 to 17 October 2021)
Most career appearances: 25, Andrew Redmayne
Most career goals: 12, Besart Berisha
Most goals by a player in a single Australia Cup season: 8, Bobô (for Sydney FC in 2017)
Most goals by a player in a single Australia Cup game: 4, joint record:
 Matt Sim (for Central Coast Mariners in 2014)
 Bobô (for Sydney FC in 2017)
Youngest player: Ymer Abili, 13 years and 243 days (for Oakleigh Cannons vs. Macarthur FC, Semi-finals, 2022)
Oldest player: Taiki Kudo, 45 years and 254 days (for Mindil Aces vs. Avondale FC, Round of 32, 2022)

Attendance records
Record home attendance: 61,880 – Western Sydney Wanderers vs. Sydney FC, played at Stadium Australia, 2016–17 A-League (8 October 2016)
Record Australia Cup attendance: 18,751 – Melbourne City vs. Sydney FC, played at Melbourne Rectangular Stadium, FFA Cup Final (30 November 2016)
Record lowest attendance: 0 – COVID-19 pandemic in Australia
Record lowest attendance (without COVID): 38 – Wellington Phoenix vs. Brisbane Roar played at Leichhardt Oval, 2021–22 A-League Men (16 February 2022)

List of Australian record competition winners

These tables list the clubs that have won honours an Australian record number of times. It lists all international competitions organised by Asian Football Confederation, Oceanian Football Confederation and FIFA as well as competitions organised by the Australian governing body Football Australia.

Ongoing competitions

Discontinued competitions

Managers
Most Championship wins: 3, joint record:
Eddie Thomson (Sydney City)
Graham Arnold (Central Coast Mariners and Sydney FC)
Most top-flight league games coached: 468, Zoran Matić
Most OFC Champions League/AFC Champions League wins: 12, Tony Popovic

See also

 List of soccer clubs in Australia by competitive honours won
 Australia men's national soccer team records and statistics
 A-League Men records and statistics

References
General
 
 

Specific

Soccer records and statistics in Australia
Australia